John Venn (1834–1923) was an English logician and mathematician.

John Venn may also refer to:

 John Venn (academic) (died 1687), English academic administrator
 John Venn (politician) (1586–1650), English politician
 John Venn (priest) (1759–1813), one of the founders of the Church Missionary Society, son of Henry Venn
 John Archibald Venn (1883–1958), British economist